Rolan's Curse II, known in Japan as  is a video game developed by NMK and released for the Game Boy in 1992. It is the sequel to the original Rolan's Curse.

Plot
King Barius is once again trying to take over the world. Ray and three other adventurers set off on a journey to put a stop to his plans for conquest.

Gameplay
The gameplay view is shown in an overhead perspective. The player starts out with one character, Ray, but can later join forces with up to seven more characters. Only three of the seven characters can join the party at once, thus some characters must be left behind. Each character has a unique skill, so choosing which characters are in the party can alter the gameplay experience. Unlike most RPGs, character stats are not raised by defeating enemies, but rather by finding treasure chests that contain powerup points.

References

1992 video games
Fantasy video games
Game Boy-only games
NMK (company) games
Video game sequels
Game Boy games
Video games developed in Japan